Marilyn Ghigliotti (born August 10, 1961) is an American actress, producer, director and make-up artist best known for playing Veronica Loughran in Clerks.

Life and career
Clerks director Kevin Smith cast her for her ability to cry while reciting a monologue for the audition. She later auditioned for Smith's Mallrats and was offered the role of Kim in Chasing Amy, but was not comfortable with kissing another woman on film.

She moved to Sayreville, New Jersey, where she attended middle school and graduated from Sayreville War Memorial High School in 1979. After high school, she earned her beautician license to do make-up and hair professionally. She worked at hair salons and later entered acting. Both of her parents are from Puerto Rico.

She performed in community theater in the New Jersey area. Since moving to Los Angeles in 1998, aside from her acting work, Ghigliotti works as a make-up artist in the TV/film industry as well as side work as a wedding stylist.

Filmography

Film

Television

Producer

Director

References

External links

1961 births
American film actresses
American television actresses
American actresses of Puerto Rican descent
Actresses from New Jersey
Actresses from New York City
Hispanic and Latino American actresses
Living people
People from Sayreville, New Jersey
Sayreville War Memorial High School alumni
Beauticians
20th-century American actresses
21st-century American actresses